CCIX may refer to:

 The Roman number notation for 209
 Cache coherent interconnect for accelerators, a consortium dealing with connectivity and communications issues in computer technology
 CCIX, a historic Association of American Railroads reporting mark for Stauffer Chemical Company, now Cleveland-Cliffs Iron Ore Co.
 UA-CCIX, the codename for the Kilgore cyborgs in the fighting video game Killer Instinct